Tabai may refer to:
 Tabaí, a town in Brazil
 Tabai (Caria), a town of ancient Caria, now in Turkey
 Ieremia Tabai, politician from Kiribati
 Marco Tabai, Italian cyclist
 Francesco Tabai, Italian long jumper